Georges Besançon (1866–1934) founded and edited the aeronautical journal L'Aérophile.

Besançon was a balloonist ("aeronaut") and journalist.
Besançon helped train the later-celebrated balloonist Salomon Andrée, probably in the late 1880s.

In 1892, Besançon and scientist Gustave Hermite sent instruments on fabric or paper balloons into the upper atmosphere for meteorological research.
In 1901, Hermite and Besançon sent up small instrumented rubber balloons that were designed to expand until at a high altitude they would burst. Then their instruments would descend by parachute.

Besançon founded the aeronautical periodical L'Aérophile in 1893, and remained its director until at least 1910.  There he covered and reported on the era in which the airplane was invented and an international airplane industry arose.

References

History of aviation
French balloonists
French journalists
1866 births
1934 deaths
Burials at Père Lachaise Cemetery
French male non-fiction writers
Atmospheric sounding